Chasing Danger is a 1939 American adventure film directed by Ricardo Cortez and written by Robert Ellis and Helen Logan. The film stars Preston Foster, Lynn Bari, Wally Vernon, Henry Wilcoxon, Joan Woodbury and Harold Huber. The film was released on May 5, 1939, by 20th Century Fox.

Plot

Cast      
Preston Foster as Steve Mitchell
Lynn Bari as Renée Claire
Wally Vernon as Waldo Winkle 
Henry Wilcoxon as Captain Andre Duvac
Joan Woodbury as Hazila
Harold Huber as Carlos Demitri
Roy D'Arcy as Corbin
Stanley Fields as Captain of the S.S. Fontaine 
Pedro de Cordoba as Gurra Din
Jody Gilbert as The Veiled Girl

References

External links 
 

1939 films
20th Century Fox films
American adventure films
1939 adventure films
American black-and-white films
Films directed by Ricardo Cortez
1930s English-language films
1930s American films
English-language adventure films